A kliek (pronunciation: cleek) is a heavy, curved bat to play kolf with.

Literature
Kolven, het plaisir om sig in dezelve te diverteren. Uitgave 2001 van de Kolfclub Utrecht St. Eloyen Gasthuis.'' (in Dutch)

External links
Koninklijke Nederlandse Kolfbond (KNKB) (with pages in English)
Kolfclub Utrecht St. Eloyen Gasthuis (with pages in English)

Sports equipment
Sport in the Netherlands